Ghost Town is a 1936 American western film directed by Harry L. Fraser and starring Harry Carey, David Sharpe and Ruth Findlay. It was produced by William Berke

Synopsis
An old miner is attacked in an effort to rob him, but is rescued by a passing cowboy who is then wrongly blamed for the assault.

Cast
 Harry Carey as Cheyenne Harry Morgan  
 David Sharpe as Bud 
 Ruth Findlay as Billie Blair  
 Jane Novak as Rose - Gang Moll  
 Lee Shumway as Boss Morrell  
 Ed Cassidy as Sheriff Blair 
 Roger Williams as Gannon - Henchman  
 Phil Dunham as Abe Rankin  
 Earl Dwire as Jim McCall  
 Chuck Morrison as Blackie Hawkes - Henchman

References

Bibliography
 Pitts, Michael R. Poverty Row Studios, 1929–1940: An Illustrated History of 55 Independent Film Companies, with a Filmography for Each. McFarland & Company, 2005.

External links
 

1936 films
1936 Western (genre) films
1930s English-language films
American Western (genre) films
Commodore Pictures films
Films directed by Harry L. Fraser
American black-and-white films
Films with screenplays by Harry L. Fraser
1930s American films